Semmel is surname of:

 Bernard Semmel (1928–2008), American historian specialising in British imperial history
 Paul Semmel (born 1939), politician from Pennsylvania

See also 
Semmel or Kaiser roll, bread roll from Vienna
Semel (disambiguation)